Dominicke Williams (born October 5, 1992), better known by his stage name Hitta J3, is an American rapper and songwriter. He is best known as a rapper in the West Coast hip hop scene and for his collaborations and remixes.

Born in Compton, California he initially released his first single "Do Yo Gudda" featuring YG, Kendrick Lamar, and Problem. After releasing "Do Yo Gudda" he signs with The Music Life Group Inc. Shortly after signing with the label he releases his first album titled "The Collect Call" in 2016. In 2018 Hitta J3 released "Case Closed" with the single "Buss Down".

Mixtapes

References

1992 births
Living people